La Crèche is a commune in the Deux-Sèvres department in the Nouvelle-Aquitaine region in western France.

Population

People from La Crèche
 Jean-Baptiste Baujault, French sculptor

See also
Communes of the Deux-Sèvres department

References

External link

Communes of Deux-Sèvres